Major General Gerald Malinga is a South African Air Force officer, currently serving as Deputy Chief of the Air Force. Born 18 May 1957 in Johannesburg, he attended school in Soweto and became a student activist while still in high school. In 1975 became a member of the Azanian People's Liberation Army.

In 1976 he left South Africa, joining APLA for military training in exile and was chosen to be trained as a pilot. In 1980 he obtained his commercial pilot's license. He integrated into the South African National Defence Force with the rank of lieutenant colonel in the South African Air Force in 1995. He joined 41 Squadron in 1996 before his appointment as commanding officer in 1998. After attending the Senior Command and Staff Course, he joined 21 Squadron before promoted to colonel and assigned as commanding officer in 2002.

In January 2004, on promotion to brigadier general, he was appointed director of education, training and development, and in March 2005 he was moved to the posted Chief Director Force Preparation with a promotion to major general, before being posted to the Joint Operations Division in June 2006 as the chief director of operations development.

In November 2010 he was appointed as general officer commanding Air Command, before being appointed to his current post in November 2011.

Education
He was awarded a Bachelor of Arts in business administration from Stillman College in 1991.

References

1957 births
Living people
People from Johannesburg
Stillman College alumni
South African Air Force generals